Ann Margarit Henningsen (born October 11, 1949 in Mexico City) is a Mexican sprint canoer who competed in the late 1960s. At the 1968 Summer Olympics, she was eliminated in the semifinals both in the K-1 500 m and K-2 500 m events.

References
Sports-reference.com profile

1949 births
Canoeists at the 1968 Summer Olympics
Living people
Mexican female canoeists
Sportspeople from Mexico City
Olympic canoeists of Mexico
Mexican people of Danish descent